Tannehill may refer to:

People
 Adamson Tannehill (1750–1820), United States Representative from Pennsylvania
 Ivan Ray Tannehill (1890–1959), American meteorologist
 Jesse Tannehill, (1874–1956) Major League Baseball pitcher
 Lee Tannehill (1880–1938), Major League infielder, brother of Jesse Tannehill
 Ryan Tannehill (born 1988), American football quarterback
 Wilkins F. Tannehill (1787–1858), American Whig politician and author
 Linda and Morris Tannehill, co-authors of The Market for Liberty

Places
 Tannehill Ironworks, a former iron furnace, now a historical state park in McCalla, Alabama
 Tannehill, Louisiana, unincorporated community in Winn Parish

See also
 Tannahill (disambiguation)